The policy of taxation in the Philippines is governed chiefly by the Constitution of the Philippines and three Republic Acts.

 Constitution: Article VI, Section 28 of the Constitution states that "the rule of taxation shall be uniform and equitable" and that "Congress shall evolve a progressive system of taxation".
 national law: National Internal Revenue Code—enacted as Republic Act No. 8424 or the Tax Reform Act of 1997 and subsequent laws amending it; the law was most recently amended by Republic Act No. 10963 or the Tax Reform for Acceleration and Inclusion Law; and,
 local laws: major sources of revenue for the local government units (LGUs) are the taxes collected by virtue of Republic Act No. 7160 or the Local Government Code of 1991, and those sourced from the proceeds collected by virtue of a local ordinance.

Taxes imposed at the national level are collected by the Bureau of Internal Revenue (BIR), while those imposed at the local level (i.e., provincial, city, municipal, barangay) are collected by a local treasurer's office.

National taxes

The taxes imposed by the national government of the Philippines include, but are not limited to:

 income tax;
 estate tax;
 donor's tax;
 value-added tax;

 percentage tax;
 excise tax; and
 documentary stamp tax.

Income tax

Income tax for individuals

Citizens of the Philippines and resident aliens must pay taxes for all income they have derived from various sources, which include, but are not limited to:

 compensation income (e.g., salary and wages);
 income of self-employed individuals and/or professionals;

 capital gains;
 interests;
 rents;

 royalties;
 dividends;
 annuities;

 prizes and winnings;
 pensions; and,
 partner's share from the profits of partnership.

Compensation and self-employment income

Individuals, including nonresident aliens, earning compensation income are taxed based only on the income tax schedule for individuals. On the other hand, self-employed individuals and professionals are taxed based on the income tax schedule for individuals, applicable percentage taxes, and value-added tax (VAT). However, if their gross sales (or gross receipts plus other non-operating income) does not exceed the VAT threshold, they have the option to be taxed either on the basis of the income tax schedule for individuals and the applicable percentage taxes, or just with a flat tax rate of 8% on their gross sales (or gross receipts plus other non-operating income).

Interests, royalties, prizes and other winnings

Interest income from bank deposits, deposit substitutes, trust funds, and other similar products (except for its long-term variants) is taxed at the rate of 20%.

Royalties, except on books, literary works and musical compositions, are taxed at the rate of 10%.

Prizes and winnings from Philippine Charity Sweepstakes Office (PCSO) Lotto in excess of P10,000 (upon which individual prizes and winnings P10,000 or below are taxed on the basis of the income tax schedule for individuals) are taxed at the rate of 20%.

Interest income from a depository bank under the expanded foreign currency deposit system is taxed at the rate of 15%.

Income from long-term deposits and investments, when pre-terminated in less than three years after making such deposit or investment, is taxed at the rate of 20%; less than four years, 12%; and, less than five years, 5%.

Dividends

Cash and property dividends are taxed at the rate of 10%.

Capital gains

Capital gains from the sale of shares of stock not traded in stock exchange are taxed at the rate of 15%.

Capital gains from the sale of real property are taxed at the rate of 6%, except when such proceeds would be used to construct a new principal residence within eighteen months after the sale of a previous principal residence had occurred.

Income tax for corporations

In general, the income tax rate for corporations is 30%. However, for-profit educational institutions and hospitals enjoy a much lower rate of 10%.

Estate tax

The transfer of the net estate is taxed at a flat rate of 6%. There is a standard deduction amounting to P5,000,000.

Donor's tax

The total value of gifts made in a calendar year shall be taxed at a flat rate of 6%. There is a standard deduction amounting to P250,000.

Value-added tax

The value-added tax (VAT) rate since 2006 is 12%.

The new VAT threshold was changed from Php 1,919,500 to Php 3,000,000 as a result of the passage of the Tax Reform for Inclusion and Acceleration (TRAIN) Law.

Exempt transactions

The following goods, services and transactions are exempted from the VAT:

 agricultural and marine food products in their original state;
 fertilizers, seeds, seedlings, fingerlings, and feeds and feed ingredients;
 importation of personal and household effects of persons resettling in the Philippines;
 importation of professional instruments, wearing apparel, and domestic animals;
 services subject to percentage tax;
 agricultural contract growers and millers;
 health care services;
 educational services;
 agricultural cooperatives, and cooperatives that are non-agricultural and non-electric in nature;

 residential lots worth at most P1,500,000, or house and lots worth at most P2,500,000
 monthly lease of residential units at most P15,000;
 books and mass media publications (e.g. newspaper and magazine);
 transport services by non-Philippine carriers;
 cargo vessels and aircraft;
 financial services;
 sales to senior citizens and persons with disability;
 from 2019, drugs prescribed for diabetes, high cholesterol and hypertension; and,
 annual sales of any other goods or services not exceeding P3,000,000.

Percentage tax

Percentage tax is a business tax imposed on persons or entities/transactions:

 who sell or lease goods, properties or services in the course of trade or business and are exempt from value-added tax (VAT) under Section 109 (w) of the National Internal Revenue Code, as amended, whose gross annual sales and/or receipts do not exceed Php 3,000,000 and who are not VAT-registered; and,
 engaged in businesses specified in Title V of the National Internal Revenue Code.

Excise taxes

Excise taxes apply to goods manufactured or produced in the Philippines for domestic sales or consumption or for any other disposition and to things imported.

Local taxes

Real property tax
One of main sources of revenues of the local government units is the real property tax, which is a tax imposed on all types of real properties including lands, buildings, improvements, and machinery.

References

 
Economy of the Philippines